The Georgia Welcome Center was built in 1961 and formally dedicated early in 1962.

This was the first welcome center in Georgia, predating the arrival of the Interstate Highway System along the Georgia Coast.  It is reportedly the oldest roadside welcome center in the U.S. that is still used for that purpose.  It is on US Highway 301 in Screven County. less than 1 mile from the South Carolina border.

References

External links
Georgia Visitor Information Center - Sylvania (Georgia Department of Transportation)

National Register of Historic Places in Screven County, Georgia
Government buildings completed in 1961
Government buildings on the National Register of Historic Places in Georgia (U.S. state)